The Newcranes are a British folk punk band, formed in Derby, England.  They are frequently compared to the Levellers and other contemporary folk-rock groups such as The Men They Couldn't Hang. The Newcranes quickly became a popular band on the early 1990s touring circuit. They signed with French label Musidisc Records and recorded their debut album, Frontline, which garnered critical acclaim and won the band many followers. They subsequently supported The Mission, Stiff Little Fingers, Bob Dylan and The Saw Doctors, and went on to release several more EPs. The band disbanded in 1996 after several line-up changes. In 2018, the principal songwriter Mark Simpson, along with bass player Bob Rushton and drummer Marcus Carter decided to reignite the band after a campaign by fans. They recruited Jonny Wallis and Julian Butt and, in March 2019, played a well-received reunion show at The Venue in Derby. The band have gone on to play festivals throughout the UK including Bearded Theory, Wickham Festival and Boomtown.
In 2022 Marcus Carter decided to leave the band to concentrate on other projects, Giles Henshaw took his place as the master of the beat.

Line-up 

Current:
 Mark Simpson: Guitars, Vocals, Mandolin, Harmonica
 Bob Rushton: Bass, Vocals
 Giles Henshaw: Drums, 
 Jonny Wallis: Vocals, Mandolin, Acoustic guitar, Electric guitar 
 Julian Butt: Accordion

Previous:
 Wolodymyr "Wolly" Dyszkant: Vocals, Mandolin, Acoustic guitar (now living in Australia)
 Micky Nesteruk: Accordion, Backing Vocals
 David Petty: Bass Guitar (Crown of Thorns)
 Steve Cosgrove: Drums and Percussion (Frontline)
 Chris Lilley: Drums (Crown of Thorns)
 Ray Buckley: Electric Guitar, Bass, Vocals (Big Bad World)
 Ken 'Kenny' Lavish: Accordion, Bass (Big Bad World)
 John Leonard: Accordion, Guitar (now with Ferocious Dog)
 Wayne Banks, now with Blaze
 Rick Millband: Drums; (now living in Australia)
Marcus Carter: Drums

Discography 

See you next Tuesday (2022)
CD Album.
Recorded and produced during the covid-19 pandemic by The Newcranes 
Theme
Turpentine 
Box of Shadows
Too Good With A Gun
Don't Drag My Body Down
Man's Inhumanity 
Natures Love
Frontline
Crown Of Thorns

Frontline (1992).
CD Mini Album. 
12" Mini Album.  Musidisc 109841/MU210.
Produced by Philip Tennant.
Prelude to Frontline based on Zapowit (The Final Testament) by Taras Shevchenko.
Frontline.
Box of Shadows.
Nature’s Love.
Theme.
Turpentine.
Man’s Inhumanity.

Don’t Drag my Body Down. (1993).
12" Single.  Vinyl Urinyl 12UV001.
CD Single.  Vinyl Urinyl CU001.
Produced by Philip Tennant.
Don’t Drag My Body Down.
West of the City.
Too Good with a Gun.

Crown of Thorns (1994).
Produced by Pat Collier.
12" Single.  Red Records.  RED121.
Crown of Thorns.
Back in the Old Country.
You Can’t Have it All.

Big Bad World (1991).
Produced by The Newcranes with Pete Stewart.
12" Single.  Vinyl Urinal. VU9155.
Big Bad World.
Natures Love.
West Of The City.

Various Artists:  Boo! Ere Cop a Load of This (1992).
Compilation Album Musidisc CD 110062.
 Turpentine & Natures Love.

Also Wolly's Travelling in Sound  (1989).
12" Album.  Reel Run Records.  SRT 9KL 2334.
Produced by Joe King.
Brighter Weather (3:05).
Sounds of Change (4:30).
I See You (3:00).
Josephina (3:25).
Can Someone Explain (5:30).
Mandonleen (3.05) Traditional Ukrainian.
At The End of the Day (2:50).
To Be With You Once Again (4:45).
Time To Go (4:20).
The Ride, The Trap (5:15).

References

External links
Official website
The Newcranes on Last.fm
DyMyr homepage (archived)
BBC Derby interview with Wolodymyr Dyszkant
BBC Derby

Folk punk groups